Maurice Rheims (4 January 1910 – 6 March 2003) was a French art auctioneer, art historian and novelist, born in Versailles. He administered the estate of the painter Pablo Picasso. He is the father of the photographer Bettina Rheims.

Bibliography
The Flowering of Art Nouveau, Harry N. Abrams, 1966. Translated by Patrick Evans. originally published in Paris by Arts et Métiers Graphiques
 The Glorious Obsession, St. Martin's Press, 1980,

External links 
 Rheims at the Académie française website

1910 births
2003 deaths
Writers from Versailles
French art historians
Members of the Académie Française
French male novelists
20th-century French writers
Winners of the Prix Broquette-Gonin (literature)
Grand Croix of the Légion d'honneur
20th-century French male writers
French people of Jewish descent
French male non-fiction writers
Burials at Montparnasse Cemetery